Wendy Sue Slutske is an American psychologist and behavior geneticist known for her research on alcohol use disorder, gambling disorder, and other addictive disorders. She is a professor and director of the Center of Excellence in Gambling Research at the University of Missouri, where she has taught since 1997. In 2011, she received the National Center for Responsible Gaming's Scientific Achievement Award in recognition of her gambling research.

References

External links
Faculty page

Living people
American women psychologists
21st-century American psychologists
Behavior geneticists
University of Missouri faculty
University of Wisconsin–Madison alumni
University of Minnesota alumni
American geneticists
American women geneticists
Year of birth missing (living people)
American women academics
21st-century American women